Rishina Kandhari is an Indian actress whose major roles include Princess Khyati on Devon Ke Dev... Mahadev, the Goddess Laxmi in Tenali Rama and Shanti Madam on Yeh Un Dinon Ki Baat Hai. Her father, Ashok Awasthi is also a television actor who does supporting roles.

Filmography

Television

Films

Web series

References

External links

Living people
Indian television actresses
Year of birth missing (living people)
Actresses in Hindi television
Actresses in Hindi cinema
People from Kandahar
21st-century Indian actresses